Igala Union was a political union in Nigeria during the nation's first republic. The union was originally made up of members from a powerful Igala group who were sympathetic to the Northern People's Congress. The union won four House of Representatives seats in the 1959 parliamentary elections

References
K. W. J. Post; The Nigerian Federal Election of 1959: Politics and Administration in a Developing Political System, Oxford University Press, 1963
Defunct political parties in Nigeria